AUO Corporation (AUO) is a Taiwanese company that specialises in optoelectronic solutions. It was formed in September 2001 by the merger of Acer Display Technology, Inc. (the predecessor of AUO, established in 1996) and Unipac Optoelectronics Corporation. AUO offers display panel products and solutions, and in recent years expanded its business to smart retail, smart transportation, general health, solar energy, circular economy and smart manufacturing service.

AUO employs 38,000 people.

History
August 1996 Acer Display Technology, Inc. (the predecessor of AUO) was founded
September 2000 Listed at Taiwan Stock Exchange Corporation
September 2001   Merged with Unipac Optoelectronics Corporation to form AUO
October 2006   Merged with Quanta Display Inc.
December 2008   Entered solar business
March 2009   G8.5 Fab in Taichung recognized as world's first LEED Gold certified TFT-LCD facility
June 2009   Joint venture with Changhong in Sichuan, China to set up module plant
April 2010   Joint venture with TCL in China to set up module plant
July 2010   Acquired AFPD Pte., Ltd.("AFPD"), subsidiary of Toshiba Mobile Display Co., Ltd. in Singapore
May 2011   G8.5 Fab in Houli recognized as world's first LEED Platinum certified TFT-LCD facility
June 2011   Acquired world's first ISO 50001 certification for manufacturing facilities
February 2012   OLED strategic alliance formed with Idemitsu in Japan
July 2012   Acquired world's first ISO 14045 eco-efficiency assessment of product systems verification
June 2013   G8.5 Fab in Houli received Taiwan's first Diamond Certification for Green Factory Building
November 2013   Named to 2013 / 2014 Ocean Tomo 300® Patent Index
April 2014   Initiated new model of solar power plant operation by founding Star River Energy Corporation
May 2014   CSR Report acquired Taiwan's first GRI G4 certificate among the manufacturing industry
May 2015   Ranked among the top 5% companies in the first Corporate Governance Evaluation released by Taiwan Stock Exchange (TWSE)
December 2015   Launched Taiwan's first process water full-recycling system
January 2019   Named to Bloomberg Gender-Equality Index since 2018
September 2019   Named to Dow Jones Sustainability World Index since 2010
November 2020   AUO recognized as the world’s first display maker to have obtained the UL 3600 certification
December 2020   AUO 9.4-inch high resolution flexible micro LED display technology honored with 2020 Innovative Product Award from Hsinchu Science Park
May 2021   AUO received Taiwan’s 1st ISO 46001 Certification Standard for Water Efficiency Management Systems
May 2021   Established AUO Display Plus, Industrial and Commercial Display Subsidiary of AUO
Sep 2021   AUO, Leader of Fourth Industrial Revolution, Selected for “Global Lighthouse Network” by WEF
Feb 2022   AUO Named Clarivate Top 100 Global Innovators For Outstanding R&D Strength and Flexible IP Strategy
Mar 2022   AUO Joins RE100 Initiative and Commits to 100% Renewable Energy by 2050

Controversies

In September 2012, AUO was sentenced to pay a US$500 million criminal fine for its participation in a five-year conspiracy to fix the prices of thin-film transistor LCD panels sold worldwide. Its American subsidiary and two former top executives were also sentenced. The two executives were sentenced to prison and fined for their roles in the conspiracy. The $500 million fine matches the largest fine imposed against a company for violating U.S. antitrust laws. In July 2014, the Ninth Circuit rejected AUO's appeal of the fine.

Shareholding and subsidiaries
Lextar Electronics Corporation
Qisda Corporation
Darwin Precision Corporation
Daxin Materials Corporation
AUO Crystal Corporation
Toppan CFI
Fargen Power Corporation

See also
 List of companies of Taiwan

References

External links 
Official Website

Taiwanese companies established in 1996
Companies listed on the New York Stock Exchange
Electronics companies of Taiwan
Display technology companies
Manufacturing companies based in Hsinchu
Electronics companies established in 1996